No Blood No Tears is a 2002 South Korean pulp noir film from director Ryoo Seung-wan.

Plot
The ill-treated mistress of a gang boss becomes friendly with an older woman who drives a taxi. Eventually the two hatch a plan to steal a bagful of money, taking some revenge in the process.

Cast
Jeon Do-yeon ... Soo-jin
Lee Hye-young ... Gyung-sun
Jung Jae-young ... Dok-bul
Ryoo Seung-bum ... Chae Min-su
Shin Goo ... Kim Geum-bok
Jung Doo-hong ... Silent Man
Baek Il-seob ... Bol-gom
Kim Young-in ... Baek-gol
Baek Chan-ki
Lee Young-hoo
Kim Su-hyeon ... Ssek Ssek Yi
Lee Mu-yeong
Im Won-hee
Ahn Gil-kang
 Lee Moon-sik ... middle-aged drunk
Ku Hye-ryeong
Kim Il-woong
Cheon Seong-hun
Kim Jong-eon
Lee Hong-pyo - tracksuit 2
Gye Sung-yong - Detective Choi

References

External links
  
 
 
 

2002 films
2000s crime thriller films
2002 action thriller films
South Korean crime thriller films
South Korean action thriller films
ADV Films
2000s crime comedy films
South Korean heist films
Films about organized crime in South Korea
Films set in Incheon
Films shot in Incheon
Films directed by Ryoo Seung-wan
2000s Korean-language films
2000s heist films
2002 comedy films
2000s South Korean films